Bedfordshire is a county in the East of England. It is bounded by Hertfordshire to the south-east, Cambridgeshire to the north-east, Northamptonshire to the north, and Buckinghamshire to the west. The county town is Bedford, and the name is first recorded in the treaty in about 879 between King Alfred the Great and Guthrum, which divided English and Danish territory by a line which went through Bedford.

Southern Bedfordshire is part of the Chilterns Area of Outstanding Natural Beauty. North and mid Bedfordshire are undulating claylands with broad river valleys of the River Great Ouse and its tributaries, and the Bedfordshire Greensand Ridge. Jurassic and Cretaceous clays are overlaid by Quaternary glacial deposits of chalky boulder clay.

There are forty Sites of Special Scientific Interest (SSSIs) in Bedfordshire, designated by Natural England. Thirty-five are listed for their biological interest, and five for their geological interest. Three of the sites are also national nature reserves, twelve are in the Chilterns Area of Outstanding Natural Beauty, and eleven are managed wholly or partly by the Wildlife Trust for Bedfordshire, Cambridgeshire and Northamptonshire. In 2009 Bedfordshire was divided into three unitary local authorities: thirty-two sites are in Central Bedfordshire, eight in Bedford and none in Luton.

Key

Interest
B = a site of biological interest
G = a site of geological interest

Other classifications
CAONB = Chilterns Area of Outstanding Natural Beauty
GCR = Geological Conservation Review
LNR = Local nature reserve
NCR = A Nature Conservation Review
NNR = National nature reserve
NT = National Trust
RHPG = Register of Historic Parks and Gardens of Special Historic Interest in England
RSPB = Royal Society for the Protection of Birds
SM = Scheduled monument
WT = Woodland Trust
WTBCN = Wildlife Trust for Bedfordshire, Cambridgeshire and Northamptonshire

Sites

See also

List of local nature reserves in Bedfordshire
National nature reserves in Bedfordshire

Notes

References

 
Bedfordshire
Sites of Special